The Valley and range sequence-Southern Yuma County is a 3-Valley sequence of NW–by–SE trending block faulted valleys and mountains. About eleven major mountain ranges connect to each other in four, (mostly parallel), mountain sequences.

This regional parallel valley-mountain sequence ends at the Gila River valley at the north; to the south, it extends to the Gran Desierto de Altar of northwestern Mexico; the sequence is a remnant of the Basin and Range system.

List of valleys
 Coyote Wash and Lechuguilla Desert
 Mohawk Valley (Arizona)
 San Cristobal Valley

Table of mountain ranges
The three valleys lay mostly between these perimeter mountain sequences.

See also
 Fault-block mountain

External links
 U.S. Bureau of Reclamation: Map of  "Surface geology of the Lower Colorado River Planning Area" – Southwestern Arizona.
 ADWR – Arizona Dept of Water Resources: Lower Colorado River Hydrology – with map

Basin and Range Province
Geography of Yuma County, Arizona
Geography of Sonora
Geology of Arizona
Geography of Arizona
Gila River
Gran Desierto de Altar
Lower Colorado River Valley
Yuma Desert